The Big Sombrero may refer to:

Tampa Stadium, nicknamed "The Big Sombrero" due to its shape, a sports venue located in Tampa, Florida
The Big Sombrero (film), a 1949 American film directed by Frank McDonald